The 2011–12 Cayman Islands Premier League season was the 33rd season of top-tier football in the Cayman Islands. It began on 18 September 2011 and ended on 28 April 2012. Elite SC were the reigning champions, having won their 2nd league title last season.

Teams
East End United were relegated to the Cayman Islands First Division after finishing eighth place in last season's competition. Taking their place in the competition were the champions of the First Division, Cayman Athletic SC.

Another spot in the league was available through a promotion/relegation playoff between the 7th-place finisher in the Premier League, Tigers FC, and the runners-up of the First Division, Academy SC. Tigers won this playoff and remained in the competition.

Locations

Standings

Promotion/relegation playoff
The 7th place team in this competition will face the runners up of the First Division for a place in next season's competition.

Results

Regular home games

Additional home games

References

External links
Official Site
Soccerway

Cayman Islands Premier League seasons
1
Cayman